Bernicia was an Anglo-Saxon kingdom in the sixth and seventh centuries.

Bernicia may also refer to:

 RV Bernicia: a research vessel owned by Newcastle University
 Earl of Bernicia, a title of the kingdom

See also
Bernician Series, former term in stratigraphy
Benicia, California, U.S.